The Campeonato Internacional de Tenis de Santos (formerly known as Santos Brasil Tennis Open) is a tennis tournament held in Santos, Brazil since 2011. The event is part of the ATP Challenger Tour and is played on clay courts.

Past finals

Singles

Doubles

References

External links
Official Website

 
ATP Challenger Tour
Clay court tennis tournaments
 
Tennis tournaments in Brazil